Michael McRae King (born May 25, 1995) is an American professional baseball pitcher for the New York Yankees of Major League Baseball (MLB). He made his MLB debut in 2019.

Amateur career
King attended Bishop Hendricken High School in Warwick, Rhode Island. He played for the school's baseball team as a pitcher and an outfielder, and helped the team win the Division I state championship in 2012, his junior year. In 2013, he was named the Gatorade Baseball Player of the Year for Rhode Island after pitching to a 7–0 win–loss record and a 0.30 earned run average (ERA) with 67 strikeouts and seven walks in 47 innings pitched. He also had a .469 batting average as an outfielder.

King graduated from Bishop Hendricken in 2013 and enrolled at Boston College, where he played college baseball for the Boston College Eagles. In 2015, he played collegiate summer baseball with the Hyannis Harbor Hawks of the Cape Cod Baseball League.

Professional career

Miami Marlins
The Miami Marlins selected King in the 12th round of the 2016 MLB draft. He signed and made his professional debut that season with the Gulf Coast Marlins of the Rookie-level Gulf Coast League before being promoted to the Batavia Muckdogs of the Class A-Short Season New York-Penn League and then to the Greensboro Grasshoppers of the Class A South Atlantic League. In  innings pitched between the three teams, he finished the season with a 3–3  record and a 4.11 ERA. He spent the 2017 season with Greensboro, where he went 11–9 with a 3.14 ERA in 26 games (25 starts).

New York Yankees
After the 2017 season, the Marlins traded King and international signing bonus money to the New York Yankees for Caleb Smith and Garrett Cooper. He began the 2018 season with the Tampa Tarpons of the Class A-Advanced Florida State League, and earned midseason promotions to the Trenton Thunder of the Class AA Eastern League and Scranton/Wilkes-Barre RailRiders of the Class AAA International League.

The Yankees invited King to spring training as a non-roster player in 2019. He suffered a stress reaction in his pitching elbow and did not pitch in spring training. The Yankees promoted him to the major leagues on September 19. He made his major league debut on September 27 versus the Texas Rangers, pitching two innings in relief. In the shortened 60-game season in 2020, King recorded a 7.76 ERA in  innings pitched across nine appearances.

Over the course of the 2021 season, King improved his slider with the assistance of Corey Kluber, a teammate. On June 4, during a game against the Boston Red Sox, King pitched an immaculate inning in the fourth inning, with three strikeouts on only nine pitches; it was the seventh in Yankees history and the first in the history of the Yankees–Red Sox rivalry. On July 8, King was placed on the injured list with a right middle finger contusion. He was later transferred to the 60-day injured list on July 27. King was activated on September 10. He finished the 2021 season with a 3.55 ERA in  innings, recording 62 strikeouts and 24 walks.

King opened the 2022 season in the Yankees bullpen. He earned his first major league save on April 14. While playing against the Orioles on July 22, 2022, King left the game with an elbow injury. His right elbow was fractured, and he underwent surgery that ruled him out for the rest of the season.

References

External links

1995 births
Living people
Sportspeople from Rochester, New York
Baseball players from New York (state)
Major League Baseball pitchers
New York Yankees players
Boston College Eagles baseball players
Hyannis Harbor Hawks players
Gulf Coast Marlins players
Batavia Muckdogs players
Greensboro Grasshoppers players
Staten Island Yankees players
Tampa Tarpons players
Trenton Thunder players
Scranton/Wilkes-Barre RailRiders players
Bishop Hendricken High School alumni